Capáez may refer to:

Places

 Capáez, Adjuntas, Puerto Rico, a barrio in the municipality of Adjuntas, Puerto Rico
 Capáez, Hatillo, Puerto Rico, a barrio in the municipality of Hatillo, Puerto Rico